Komani is a town in South Africa.

Komani may also refer to:
 Komani River, a river in South Africa
 Lake Komani, a reservoir in Albania
 Komani Hydro Power Plant
 Norman Komani, Zimbabwean football player

See also 
 Comani (disambiguation)
 Kumani (disambiguation)
 Konami (disambiguation)